Journal of Materials Processing Technology is a peer-reviewed scientific journal covering research on all aspects of processing techniques used in manufacturing components from various materials. It is published by Elsevier and the editor-in-chief is J. Cao (Northwestern University).

Abstracting and indexing
The journal is abstracted and indexed in Scopus, Science Citation Index Expanded, Metadex, and Inspec. The journal has a 2021 impact factor of 6.162.

References

External links
 

Materials science journals
English-language journals
Elsevier academic journals